Bahnsen Theological Seminary was a Calvinist theological training institution, founded in 1997 and based in Placentia, California. It was most notably associated with Greg Bahnsen and Kenneth Gentry. It served as the degree granting division of the Southern California Center for Christian Studies.
It offered instruction worldwide by correspondence, as well as courses presented locally. BTS offered four Master's degree programs; Master of Divinity, Master of Christian Studies, Master of Apologetics, and Master of Philosophy.

Faculty included:

Kenneth Gentry Jr. ThD, ordained minister in the PCA

Roger Wagner, ordained minister and pastor of Bayview Orthodox Presbyterian Church in Chula Vista, CA.

Michael Butler, graduated magna cum laude from CSUF with a B.A. in philosophy and history, and a M.A. in Philosophy from Claremont Graduate School.

Jerry Crick, ordained as a minister in the Presbyterian Church of America and now serves as pastor of Scottish Presbyterian Kirk of the Covenant in Simpsonville, SC.

Michael Mang, ordained minister in the P.C.A. and pastor of Fellowship Presbyterian Church in Greer, SC.

Jeffrey Ventrella, ordained Ruling Elder in the Orthodox Presbyterian Church and regularly preaches and lectures in churches and mission works throughout the Pacific Northwest.

George Scipione, minister in the Orthodox Presbyterian Church.

References

External links
 

Presbyterian universities and colleges in the United States
Seminaries and theological colleges in California
Placentia, California
Universities and colleges in Orange County, California
Reformed church seminaries and theological colleges
Educational institutions established in 1997
1997 establishments in California
Christian reconstructionism
Unaccredited Christian universities and colleges in the United States